Mohammad Alinezhaad is an Iranian footballer who plays as a winger for Iranian football club Sepahan.

Club career
Alinejad started his youth career with his hometown club, Esteghlal Gorgan. He later joined the Esteghlal and Malavan academies. Alinejad began his senior career with Etka Gorgan in the summer of 2014 and made seven appearances for the club in the Azadegan League. After Etka Gorgan resigned from the Azadegan League in the winter of 2015, Alinejad moved to League 2 side Pars Jonoubi Jam. He moved on to Saipa in the summer of 2015 and made his professional debut against Persepolis on 16 September as a substitute for Reza Norouzi.

References

1993 births
Living people
Iranian footballers
People from Gorgan
Association football forwards
Etka Gorgan players
F.C. Pars Jonoubi Jam players
Saipa F.C. players
Nassaji Mazandaran players
Naft Masjed Soleyman F.C. players
Aluminium Arak players
Persian Gulf Pro League players
Azadegan League players